This is a list of earthquakes in 1955. Only magnitude 6.0 or greater earthquakes appear on the list. Lower magnitude events are included if they have caused death, injury or damage. Events which occurred in remote areas will be excluded from the list as they wouldn't have generated significant media interest. All dates are listed according to UTC time. This was somewhat a year of contrast. The number of magnitude 7.0+ quakes was up on the previous year. The largest quake only reached 7.5 in magnitude. The death toll during the year was relatively low with most of the 504 deaths coming in the Philippines in March. Four-hundred died in the quake which struck Mindanao. Other deadly events struck most notably China and Egypt.

Overall

By death toll 

 Note: At least 10 casualties

By magnitude 

 Note: At least 7.0 magnitude

Notable events

January

February

March

April

May

June

July

August

September

October

November

December

References

1955
 
1955